Following is a list of notable members of the Khatri community in India.

Historical figures

Religious figures 
 Sikh Gurus
 Guru Nanak Dev Bedi, founder of Sikhism
 Guru Angad Dev, Trehan
 Guru Amar Das, Bhalla
 Guru Ram Das, Sodhi
 Guru Arjan Dev, Sodhi
 Guru Har Gobind, Sodhi
 Guru Har Rai, Sodhi
 Guru Har Krishan, Sodhi
 Guru Tegh Bahadur, Sodhi
 Guru Gobind Singh Sodhi, founder of Khalsa 
 Bhai Daya Singh Sobti, the first of the Panj Pyare (the initial members of the Khalsa), belonged to the Sobti clan of the Khatris
 Baba Sri Chand was the founder of the ascetic sect of Udasin and was the elder son of Guru Nanak, first Guru and founder of Sikhism.
 Baba Prithi Chand Sodhi (1558–1618), the eldest son of Guru Ram Das after the younger brother Guru Arjan was the founder of the Mina sect.
 Ram Rai Sodhi, the eldest son of Guru Har Rai was the founder of Ram Raiyas sect of Sikhism.
 Shiv Dayal Singh, founder of the Radhasoami religious movement.
 Baba Dayal Singh Malhotra, founder of Nirankari

Sikh Empire 
 Hari Singh Nalwa (Uppal Khatri) (1791–1837), the Commander-in-Chief of the Khalsa army of the Sikh Empire under Ranjit Singh
 Dewan Mokham Chand Kochhar (1785-1814), General of the Khalsa Army under Ranjit Singh
 Diwan Sawan Mal Chopra, Governor of Lahore and Multan, Commander in the Khalsa Army
 Diwan Mulraj Chopra (1814–1851), Governor of Multan, leader of a rebellion against the British which led to the Second Anglo-Sikh War
 Sardar Gulaba Khatri, founder of Dallewalia Misl which controlled Nakodar, Talwan, Badala, Rahon, Phillaur, Ludhiana at its peak.

Others 
 Sultan Muzaffar Shah I, the founder of the Gujarat Sultanate, a Muslim Khatri kingdom and it's ruling Muzaffarid Dynasty. He was a Tanka Khatri convert to Islam.
 Maharaja Bijay Chand Mahtab Kapoor GCIE, KCSI, IOM, with origins from Kotli, Sialkot was the ruler of Bardhaman Raj in Bengal from 1887 till his death in 1941.  At its height, the kingdom extended to around 5,000 square miles (13,000 km) and included many parts of what is now Burdwan, Bankura, Medinipur, Howrah, Hooghly and Murshidabad districts
 Maharaja Uday Chand Mahtab of Bardhaman Raj, K.C.I.E., (14 July 1905 – 10 October 1984) was the last ruler of Burdwan Raj, who ruled from 1941 until 1955
 Maharaja Chandu Lal was the prime minister (1833–1844) for 3rd Nizam of Hyderabad Sikandar Jah.
 Maharaja Kishen Pershad, GCIE (1864-1940) came from a Peshkari Hyderabadi Noble family and served as the Prime Minister of Hyderabad State twice 
 Raja Sukh Jiwan Mal, The ruler of Kashmir (1754-1762)
 Raja Todar Mal Tandon, finance minister of Akbar. He rebuilt the Kashi Vishwanath Temple in 1585.
 Haqiqat Rai Puri, beheaded at the age of 14 for refusing to convert to Islam by Governor Zakariya Khan. Puri stood up against his classmates ridiculing Hindu deities.

Indian military 
 Vikram Batra, Param Vir Chakra awardee during the 1999 Kargil War.
 General Pran Nath Thapar, 4th Chief of the Indian Army.
 General J.J Singh Marwah , 21st Chief of Indian Army
 Admiral Sardarilal Mathradas Nanda, 7th Chief of the Indian Navy.
 Air Marshal Om Prakash Mehra, Chief of the Indian Air Force.

Indian independence activists 
  Sukhdev, Indian freedom fighter, he participated in several actions alongside Bhagat Singh and Shivaram Rajguru, and was hanged by the British authorities on 23 March 1931 at the age of 23. He was a Thapar Khatri.
 Madan Lal Dhingra, Indian freedom fighter, While studying in England, he assassinated William Hutt Curzon Wyllie, a British official.
 Prem Krishan Khanna, Indian freedom fighter and a member of the Hindustan Republican Association. One of the revolutionaries prosecuted for the Kakori Conspiracy.
 Purushottam Das Tandon, Indian freedom fighter who opposed the partition of India, British rule over India. He was awarded the Bharat Ratna, India's highest civilian award in 1961.

Science, technology and academics 
 Satish Dhawan, former chairman of the Indian Space Research Organisation (ISRO)
 Har Gobind Khorana, Nobel Prize winner
 Harish-Chandra Mehrotra, Indian-American mathematician and physicist, recipient of the Padma Bhushan. He was considered for a Field's Medal in 1958. 
 Daya Ram Sahni, first director-general of the Archaeological Survey of India (ASI)
 Ram Nath Chopra, Father of Indian Pharmacology
 Birbal Sahni, Indian Paleobotanist and elected a Fellow of the Royal Society of London (FRS) 
 Mahesh Prasad Mehray,  Indian ophthalmologist and the founder of Sitapur Eye Hospital
 Mahatma Hansraj, co-founder of Dayanand Anglo-Vedic Schools (D.A.V) on whose memory Hansraj College was established.
Faqir Chand Kohli, also known as "father of Indian software Industry", founder of Tata Consulltancy Services (TCS)

Business and finance 
 J.C and K.C Mahindra ,founders of Mahindra & Mahindra.It is a part of the Mahindra Group,an Indian conglomerate
 Mohan Singh Oberoi ,founder and chairman of The Oberoi Group
 Karam Chand Thapar, of the Thapar Group of companies.
 HP Nanda, founder of Escorts Limited
 Ponty Chadha, founder of Wave Group
 Om Prakash Munjal, founder of Hero MotoCorp and Hero Cycles
 Lala Jagat Narain, founder of Punjab Kesri
 Lala Harkishen Lal, also known as "Napoleon of Finance", co-founder of Punjab National Bank

Bollywood 
 Dev Anand, Indian actor
 Kanika Kapoor, Indian singer
 Prithviraj Kapoor, Indian actor
 Raj Kapoor, Indian actor
Balraj Sahni, Indian actor
 B.R Chopra, Indian director
 Rajesh Khanna, Indian actor
 Ayushmann Khurrana, Indian actor
 Parineeti Chopra, Indian actor

Literature and Poetry 

 Amrita Pritam (born in Gujranwala), Punjabi author
 Devaki Nandan Khatri, Hindi author

Politics 

 Inder Kumar Gujral (born in Jhelum), 12th Prime Minister of India
Gulzarilal Nanda (born in Sialkot), Two-time Acting Prime Minister of India
Giani Gurmukh Singh Musafir (born in Attock), Former Chief Minister of Punjab
Balraj Madhok, RSS veteran and founder of ABVP & BJS
Sheila Kapoor Dikshit (born in Kapurthala), Former Chief Minister of Delhi
Madan Lal Khurana (born in Lyallpur), Former Chief Minister of Delhi
Tara Singh, Indian political and religious leader

References 

Khatri